Latmus or Latmos was a town of ancient Caria. It was a polis (city-state) and a member of the Delian League.

Strabo writes that it was also known as "Heracleia below Latmus".,

Its site is located near Heraclea ad Latmum, Asiatic Turkey.

References

Populated places in ancient Caria
Former populated places in Turkey
Greek city-states
Members of the Delian League
Milas District
History of Muğla Province